The Manx Trophy or Isle of Man International Road Race is a bicycle road race run annually on the Isle of Man. In the 1960s the race attracted the world's top professional cyclists including Fausto Coppi, Jacques Anquetil and Eddy Merckx.

The race was a feature of the Isle of Man cycling festival, an annual event which ran from 1936 to 2003 and was started by journalist and cycling enthusiast Curwen Clague. 
The first festival included a massed-start road race (a rarity in mainland Britain at the time but allowed in the Isle of Man, a self-governing crown dependency) which featured the top riders of the day. Despite closed roads the race saw many crashes and only a few riders finished. The first winner was Charles Holland of Birmingham, later one of the first two Englishmen to ride the Tour de France.

The distance was later increased to two and then three laps.

The Manx Trophy was reintroduced in April 2016 as a one-day race by Manx International Cycling Ltd, named the Manx International Cycling GP, forming part of the British Cycling Spring Cup over 3 laps of the TT Mountain Circuit, and in 2017 hosted the National Road Race Championships where Steve Cummings won both the National Time Trial and Road Race events. In 2019 the event was relaunched as a 3 day stage race forming part of the HSBC UK|British Cycling National Mens Road Race Series.

Winners (not a complete list)

Manx Trophy/Isle of Man International Road Race

Manx International Cycling GP

References

Notes

External links
 Manx International on veloarchive.com
 History of Manx International Cycling Race

Cycle races in the Isle of Man
Recurring sporting events established in 1936
1936 establishments in the Isle of Man
Men's road bicycle races
Snaefell Mountain Course
Summer events in the Isle of Man